Rosa Morena is a 2010 Danish-Brazilian drama film directed by Carlos Augusto de Oliveira. The film premiered at the 2010 São Paulo International Film Festival.

Plot 
Unable to adopt a child in Denmark, Thomas, a 42-year-old architect, travels to Brazil to try to realize the dream of being a father. In São Paulo, he meets Jakob, an old Danish friend who introduces him to Maria, a humble young woman who is pregnant from her third child. She enters into an agreement with Thomas to donate the baby in exchange for better living conditions. Thomas moves to the house of Maria and their relationship evolves in unexpected ways.

References

External links
 
 

2010 films
2010s Portuguese-language films
2010s Danish-language films
Brazilian LGBT-related films
Danish LGBT-related films
Films set in São Paulo
Films shot in São Paulo
2010 multilingual films
Brazilian multilingual films
Danish multilingual films